Lampropeltis getula floridana or the Florida kingsnake  is a snake species native to southern Florida. On average, they grow between 3.5–5 ft but 6 ft individuals have been recorded.

Care
Like other kingsnakes, this species is relatively easy to care for. They should be housed in a 20-40 gallon aquarium with aspen shavings for them to burrow in. Pine shavings are toxic to reptiles. The temperature should be around 84-90 degrees during the day and Nighttime temperatures should range between 68 and 75 degrees. Like other snakes, they should feed on pinkie or fuzzie mice as babies, then gradually increase in size until the snake reaches adulthood, which by then they should be eating large mice.

Gallery

References

https://www.flmnh.ufl.edu/herpetology/fl-snakes/list/lampropeltis-getula-floridana/

http://projectsimusflorida.synthasite.com/fl-kingsnake.php

Lampropeltis